Sicard may refer to:

 Sicard (given name)
 Sicard (surname)
 USS Sicard (DD-346), a Clemson class destroyer in the United States Navy
 Sicard Flat, California, an unincorporated community in Yuba County, California